The women's shot put event at the 1952 Summer Olympics took place on 26 July at the Helsinki Olympic Stadium. Soviet athlete Galina Zybina won the gold medal and set new world and Olympic records.

Medalists

Results

Qualifying round

Qualification: Qualifying Performance 12.30 advance to the Final.

Final

References

External links
Official Olympic Report, la84.org.

Athletics at the 1952 Summer Olympics
Shot put at the Olympics
1952 in women's athletics
Women's events at the 1952 Summer Olympics